Imbros is an island in Turkey. It may also refer to:
Imbros Gorge, a canyon on the Greek island of Crete
Imbros (horse), an American thoroughbred racehorse

See also
Battle of Imbros (1717)
Battle of Imbros (1918)